Peter Fernando was a Roman Catholic prelate from India.

Early life
Bishop Peter Fernando was a Roman Catholic bishop who was born in Idinthakarai, a coastal village of the district of Tirunelveli and a parish of Roman Catholic diocese of Tuticorin on 22 March 1939. He was ordained a priest for the diocese of Tuticorin on 31 May 1971.

Episcopal Ministry
On 23 February 1996, Bishop Peter Fernando was appointed coadjutor bishop of the Roman Catholic Diocese of Tuticorin, India and was ordained bishop on 29 May 1996; he succeeded Bishop Siluvaimathu Teresanathan Amalnather and served as diocesan bishop of the Tuticorin Diocese from 1999 to 2004. He was appointed as the apostolic administrator of the diocese of Trichy. He then served as archbishop of the Roman Catholic Archdiocese of Madurai from 2003 to 2014. He died on 31 December 2016.

Notes

External links
Bishop Peter Fernando

1939 births
2016 deaths
21st-century Roman Catholic archbishops in India